Shumkovo is the name of several rural localities in Russia:
Shumkovo, Alexandrovsky District, Perm Krai, a village in Alexandrovsky District, Perm Krai
Shumkovo, Beryozovsky District, Perm Krai, a village in Beryozovsky District, Perm Krai